"Wedding Bell" (ウエディング・ベル) is the debut single by the Japanese trio Sugar, released on November 21, 1981, by For Life Music. The single charted on the Oricon charts at No. 2.

Composition 
The lyrics describe the feelings of a woman who was invited to the church where her lover is being married to another woman. The sarcastic lyrics were accompanied by the lines "kutabatchi mae!" (くたばっちまえ!) and "Amen" (アーメン), with anger towards the bride and groom and the gap between the three beautiful and pretty choruses made the record a huge hit with sales of about 700,000 copies. The song was included in their performance at the 33rd Kōhaku Uta Gassen with the Red Group, their only performance. Because of the content of the lyrics, the song was said to be blasphemy towards Christianity. For a while, some of the lyrics had faded out due to self-regulation at the local NHK Kobe Broadcasting Station.

The trio also released "Wedding Bell II" in November 1982. The lyrics contrasts the ideal life in the first "Wedding Bell" with the wife's dissatisfaction with her husband who does not spend time with her because of work relationships, despite the fact that she is newly married. The single also has a karaoke version which includes the lines "kutabatchi mae!" (くたばっちまえ!) and "Amen" (アーメン), but the sound effects are different.

Track listing

Cover versions 
On February 2, 2005, Masami Makino covered the song in his album Furawākēsu. (フラワーケース)
In 2007, Chiaki Takahashi, Asami Imai, and Mayako Nigo covered the song in the radio show The Idolm@ster Radio.
On April 31, 2009, Puffy AmiYumi covered the song as the theme song for the Fuji TV show Konkatsu! (婚カツ!)
On May 26, 2010, the band Roly Poly Rag Bear in the compilation album Tōkyō Auto Reverse Neo Shibuya-kei 80's. (TOKYO Auto-Reverse 〜ネオ渋谷系×80's〜)
On May 30, 2012, Yūki Amami and Yuko Oshima recorded the song for the Drama Kaeru no Ōjo Sama. (カエルの王女さま)
On September 12, 2012, Mimei Sakamoto recorded the song for her album Ramajido Uramūru. (ラマジドゥラムール)
On June 2, 2013, Guitar☆Man covered the song in his "Guitar Man Factory" series.
On August 24, 2016, Seiko Oomori recorded the song for her single "Pinku Metosera/Tsutsutoru Summer". (ピンクメトセラ/勹″ッと<るSUMMER)
On November 7, 2018, the trio Mizmo recorded the song for their EP Uta Utaishō Kumo no Maki EP (歌謡抄〜雲の巻〜 -EP)
On July 26, 2019, Mai Nagatani (as Chay) recorded the song in the single "Wedding Bell (with Gentle Forest Jazz Band)".

References 

1981 songs
1981 debut singles